Stanley Ellis may refer to:

 Stanley Ellis (linguist) (1926–2009), English linguistics scholar and broadcaster
 Stanley Ellis (cricketer) (1896–1987), English cricketer